Stockland may refer to:

 Stockland, a multinational company.
 Stockland, Devon, a small village in Devon, UK.
 Stockland Bristol a village in Somerset, UK